Avia (ICAO: AGW) was an airline based in Johannesburg, South Africa, it started operations in April 1995 and ended them in August of the same year. Avia flew from Johannesburg to London-Gatwick Airport, which was their only route. They operated one Boeing 747SP.

References

External links

Avia route information
Avia Airlines Fleet Details and History

Airlines disestablished in 1995
Airlines established in 1995
Companies based in Johannesburg
Defunct airlines of South Africa
1995 establishments in South Africa
1995 disestablishments in South Africa